A Place in the World is a 1992 drama film co-written, co-produced and directed by Adolfo Aristarain, and starring Federico Luppi. It stars José Sacristán, Federico Luppi, Leonor Benedetto and Cecilia Roth.

The movie won numerous awards and was also nominated for the Academy Award for Best International Feature Film; however, it was declared ineligible and removed from the final ballot because it had been submitted by Uruguay, which had exercised insufficient artistic control over the film. It is the only film so far to have been disqualified from this category after it secured a nomination.

In a survey of the 100 greatest films of Argentine cinema carried out by the Museo del Cine Pablo Ducrós Hicken in 2000, the film reached the 14th position. In a new version of the survey organized in 2022 by the specialized magazines La vida útil, Taipei and La tierra quema, presented at the Mar del Plata International Film Festival, the film reached the 34th position.

Synopsis
The story is set during the return of democracy to Argentina, in 1983. While they live their lives, a group of characters argue about the country's most controversial subjects at the time: religion, politics, and human rights.

Cast
 José Sacristán as Hans
 Federico Luppi as Mario
 Leonor Benedetto as Nelda
 Cecilia Roth as Ana
 Rodolfo Ranni as Andrada
 Hugo Arana as Zamora
 Gastón Batyi as Ernesto
 Lorena del Río as Luciana
 Mario Alarcón as Juan

Critical reception
Critic Mick LaSalle, film critic for the San Francisco Chronicle, liked the film and wrote, "A Place in the World is a sensitive, beautifully made coming-of-age story, set against a backdrop of Argentine politics played out on a local scale. Featuring a cast of strong characters, all driven by their deepest beliefs and passions, this is that rare case of a film that's not just lovely -- it's lively, too."

Film critic James Berardinelli wrote, "The acting is uniformly strong, with all the principal and secondary performers delivering believable portrayals. Celia (sic: Cecilia) Roth is especially worthy of mention for the emotion she projects through her eyes. She and Federico Luppi are perfectly matched. A Place in the World offers a frank, somewhat unusual view of the relationships that form families and communities. Although the film has a lot more meat to chew on than that, the issues presented by A Place in the World would not generate the same degree of interest without the characters who argue about and live them. It's hard to deny the effectiveness of this marriage between personalities and ideology where neither eclipses the other."

Oscar controversy
A Place in the World, which was registered for the Golden Globes as an entry from Argentina alone, was originally submitted in the fall of 1992 to Argentina's Oscar selection committee as a possible contender. However, the committee chose (by one vote) to submit The Dark Side of the Heart instead. A Place in the World's director Adolfo Aristarain then asked Antonio Mercader, Uruguay's Minister of Education and Culture, to submit the film as a Uruguayan entry. After the minister refused, Aristarain took the matter to Manuel Martinez Carril, director of the Cinematheque of Uruguay, who agreed to sponsor the film for submission to the Academy's foreign-language film committee.

When the nominations were announced by the Academy on February 17, 1993, A Place in the World was initially included among the five nominees, and was presented as a Uruguayan submission. However, a week later, the Academy launched an investigation after it was revealed that the film was almost entirely Argentine with minimal input from Uruguayan artists. It was disqualified three days later, with the Academy saying it was essentially an Argentine production and that this violated the Academy's rules which require that there be "substantial filmmaking input from the country that submits the film". There have only been a small number of times in the Academy's history that a film was disqualified after being nominated. One previous case was that of the documentary Young Americans (1967), which had won the Academy Award for Documentary Feature but was later ruled ineligible after it was revealed that it had opened theatrically prior to the Academy's eligibility period. The disqualification of A Place in the World was all the more unusual as the Academy decided not to replace it with another film, leaving only four films in competition.

Aristarain, who argued that the film was an international co-production between Uruguay and Argentina, contested the Academy's decision, and filed suit in the United States District Court for the Central District of California on March 4. Aristarain cited the precedents set by Black and White in Color (1976), Le Bal (1983) and Dangerous Moves (1984), all of which were French productions but which were submitted, respectively, by Ivory Coast, Algeria and Switzerland. After the judge determined that, while in the past Academy procedures may have been lax, the organization had essentially followed its rules, Aristarain decided not to take the case to appeal, as ballots were already being mailed to voters and the awards ceremony was about to take place.

Because of the controversy surrounding A Place in the Worlds disqualification, the Academy adopted in the summer of 1993 new guidelines aimed at clarifying its eligibility rules for the Foreign Language Film category, and especially at making more specific the role played by each crew member. It is also worth mentioning that in its November 2001 press release listing the foreign language submissions to the 74th Academy Awards, the Academy announced that a film from Uruguay (In This Tricky Life) had "qualified this year for the first time", thereby omitting any mention of A Place in the World.

AwardsWins'
 San Sebastian Film Festival: Golden Seashell, Adolfo Aristarain; OCIC Award, Adolfo Aristarain; 1992.
 Nantes Three Continents Festival: Audience Award, Adolfo Aristarain;  1992.
 Goya Awards: Best Foreign Film in Spanish Language; 1993.
 Argentine Film Critics Association Awards: Silver Condor, Best Actor, Federico Luppi; Best Actress, Cecilia Roth; Best Director, Adolfo Aristarain; Best Film; Best Music, Emilio Kauderer; Best New Actor, Gaston Batyi; Best Original Screenplay, Adolfo Aristarain, Alberto Lecchi, and Kathy Saavedra; Best Supporting Actor, José Sacristán; 1993.
 Fribourg International Film Festival: Audience Award, Adolfo Aristarain; 1993.
 Gramado Film Festival: Golden Kikito, Best Latin Film, Adolfo Aristarain; 1993.
 Ondas Awards: Film Award, Best Director, Adolfo Aristarain; 1993.

See also
 List of Argentine films of 1992
 List of Spanish films of 1992
 List of submissions to the 65th Academy Awards for Best Foreign Language Film
 List of Uruguayan submissions for the Academy Award for Best Foreign Language Film

References

External links
 
 
 Un lugar en el mundo at the cinenacional.com 
 

1992 films
1992 drama films
Argentine independent films
1990s Spanish-language films
Spanish independent films
Uruguayan independent films
1992 independent films
Argentine coming-of-age films
Spanish coming-of-age films
Uruguayan coming-of-age films
1990s Argentine films
1990s Spanish films